Shalma (also Romanized as Shālmā and Shalmā; also known as Shalmah and Shālmā Khorūm) is a village in Masal Rural District, in the Central District of Masal County, Gilan Province, Iran. At the 2006 census, its population was 372, in 96 families.

References 

Populated places in Masal County